Following is a list of past and present Members of Parliament (MPs) of the United Kingdom whose surnames begin with Q.

 Q